The crempog (plural: crempogau) is a Welsh pancake made with flour, buttermilk, eggs, vinegar and salted butter. It is traditionally served at celebrations in Wales, such as Shrove Tuesday and birthdays.

Name
The word "crempog" has its origins in the Welsh language, but is similar to the Breton word , which is also a type of pancake. Comparisons are often drawn between the two Celtic languages which share ancestry in the Brittonic language, though the krampouezh is more dainty than the crempog and is today closer to a crêpe than a pancake.

The English word crumpet may be derived from crempog or Cornish .

History

The history of food in Wales is poorly documented, and much of what is known lies in verbal and archaeological evidence. Wales has a long history of baking using a bakestone (Welsh: maen), a large round portable flatstone. Bakestones were commonly used throughout rural Wales for making flatbreads with evidence of their use found in farmhouses and in the homes of landed gentry. Early flatstones were placed on a tripod over an open fire, though in many areas, especially in south-west Wales, a specially designed circular ironframe with a half hoop handle was used. By the early decades of the twentieth century built-in wall ovens were common throughout kitchens in Wales, though these would be wood and coal burning. The tradition of using a bakestone coexisted with these newer ovens. Heating the large ovens was generally confined to one day a week and was used to make bread and cakes to last the family until the next week. These were augmented with whatever could be cooked over the open fireplace using the bakestone.

Although there is no documented evidence of the earliest crempog recipe, the basic ingredients, readily available in Wales suggests a long history. The recipe for  reflects very old cookery traditions that were once common throughout Britain. Bobby Freeman, writing in 1980, states that , along with cawl, is the one Welsh ingredient to have endured from past times. Despite  being a staple of Welsh cuisine due to its ease of preparation in past times, it is also connected to traditional celebrations.  was served on Shrove Tuesday throughout Wales and was associated with birthdays, especially in south Wales, where the stack of pancakes are cut down in wedges and served like a cake.

Preparation
For the standard  recipe, butter is melted in warm buttermilk and then poured into a well of flour and beaten. The mixture is meant to stand for a few hours. A second mixture is made using sugar, bicarbonate of soda, vinegar and beaten eggs. The mixtures are then combined to make a smooth, dense batter.

The thick batter is poured onto a hot bakestone or griddle, over a moderate heat. The  is cooked until golden on both sides and served in a stack with butter spread on each pancake.

Variants

The Glamorganshire  are almost identical to Scottish pancakes (drop scones), which may have been brought to the region by Scottish labourers during the industrialization of the south Wales coalfields, but the piling of them into a stack smothered in butter harks to Welsh traditions.

In poetry
A Welsh verse sung by children refers to crempogau:

 
 
 
 
 
 
 
 
 
 

In English:

 Auntie Elin Enog
 Please may I have a pancake?
 You can have tea and brown sugar
 And your apron full of pudding
 Auntie Elin Enog
 My mouth is parched for pancakes
 My mum is too poor to buy flour
 And Sian is too lazy to get the treacle
 And my father's too sick to work
 Please may I have a pancake?

See also
 Crumpet
 List of pancakes
 List of English words of Celtic origin

References

 Bibliography

External links
 Crempog recipe at www.everything2.com
Crempogs Ynys Mon recipe

Welsh cuisine
Pancakes